The Orange County Giants is a United States Australian Football League team, based in Orange County, California, United States. It was founded in 1998. They play in the Californian Australian Football League.

References

External links
 

Australian rules football clubs in the United States
Bombers
Ladera Ranch, California
Australian rules football clubs established in 1998
1998 establishments in California
Greater Western Sydney Giants